The wood industry or timber industry (sometimes lumber industry -- when referring mainly to sawed boards) is the industry concerned with forestry, logging, timber trade, and the production of primary forest products and wood products (e.g. furniture) and secondary products like wood pulp for the pulp and paper industry. Some of the largest producers are also among the biggest owners of timberland. The wood industry has historically been and continues to be an important sector in many economies.

Distinction
In the narrow sense of the terms, wood, forest, forestry and timber/lumber industry appear to point to different sectors, in the industrialized, internationalized world, there is a tendency toward huge integrated businesses that cover the complete spectrum from silviculture and forestry in private primary or secondary forests or plantations via the logging process up to wood processing and trading and transport (e.g. timber rafting, forest railways, logging roads).

Processing and products differs especially with regard to the distinction between softwood and hardwood. While softwood primarily goes into the production of wood fuel and pulp and paper, hardwood is used mainly for furniture, floors, etc.. Both types can be of use for building and (residential) construction purposes (e.g. log houses, log cabins, timber framing).

Production chain

Top producers 

As of 2019, the top timberland owners in the USA were structured as real-estate investment trusts and include:

Weyerhaeuser Co.
Rayonier
PotlatchDeltic

In 2008 the largest lumber and wood producers in the USA were
Boise Cascade
North Pacific Group
Sierra Pacific Industries

As these companies are often publicly traded, their ultimate owners are a diversified group of investors. There are also timber-oriented real-estate investment trusts.

According to sawmilldatabase, the world top producers of sawn wood in 2007 were:

Issues

Safety

Noise 
Workers within the forestry and logging industry sub-sector fall within the agriculture, forestry, fishing, and hunting (AFFH) industry sector as characterized by the North American Industry Classification System (NAICS). The National Institute for Occupational Safety and Health (NIOSH) has taken a closer look at the AFFH industry's noise exposures and prevalence of hearing loss. While the overall industry sector had a prevalence of hearing loss lower than the overall prevalence of noise-exposed industries (15% v. 19%), workers within forestry and logging exceeded 21%. Thirty-six percent of workers within forest nurseries and gathering of forest products, a sub-sector within forestry and logging, experienced hearing loss, the most of any AFFH sub-sector. Workers within forest nurseries and gathering of forest products are tasked with growing trees for reforestation and gathering products such as rhizomes and barks. Comparatively, non-noise-exposed workers have only a 7% prevalence of hearing loss.

Worker noise exposures in the forestry and logging industry have been found to be up to 102 dBA. NIOSH recommends that a worker have an 8-hour time-weighted average of noise exposure of 85 dBA. Excessive noise puts workers at an increased risk of developing hearing loss. If a worker were to develop a hearing loss as a result of occupational noise exposures, it would be classified as occupational hearing loss. Noise exposures within the forestry and logging industry can be reduced by enclosing engines and heavy equipment, installing mufflers and silencers, and performing routine maintenance on equipment. Noise exposures can also be reduced through the hierarchy of hazard controls where removal or replacement of noisy equipment serves as the best method of noise reduction.

Injury 

The Bureau of Labor Statistics (BLS) has found that fatalities of forestry and logging workers have increased from 2013 to 2016, up from 81 to 106 per year. In 2016, there were 3.6 cases of injury and illness per 100 workers within this industry.

Illegal logging

Economy 
The existence of a wood economy, or more broadly, a forest economy (in many countries a bamboo economy predominates), is a prominent matter in many developing countries as well as in many other nations with a temperate climate and especially in those with low temperatures. These are generally the countries with greater forested areas so conditions allow for development of local forestry to harvest wood for local uses. The uses of wood in furniture, buildings, bridges, and as a source of energy are widely known. Additionally, wood from trees and bushes, can be used in a variety of products, such as wood pulp, cellulose in paper, celluloid in early photographic film, cellophane, and rayon (a substitute for silk).

At the end of their normal usage, wood products can be burnt to obtain thermal energy or can be used as a fertilizer. The potential environmental damage that a wood economy could occasion include a reduction of biodiversity due to monoculture forestry (the intensive cultivation of very few trees types); and CO2 emissions. However, forests can aid in the reduction of atmospheric carbon dioxide and thus limit climate change.

Paper is today the most used wood product.

History of use of wood 
The wood economy was the starting point of the civilizations worldwide, since eras preceding the Paleolithic and the Neolithic. It necessarily preceded ages of metals by many millennia, as the melting of metals was possible only through the discovery of techniques to light fire (usually obtained by the scraping of two very dry wooden rods) and the building of many simple machines and rudimentary tools, as canes, club handles, bows, arrows, lances. One of the most ancient handmade articles ever found is a polished wooden spear tip (Clacton Spear) 250,000 years old (third interglacial period), that was buried under sediments in England, at Clacton-on-Sea.

Successive civilizations such as the Egyptians and Sumerians built sophisticated objects of furniture. Many types of furniture in ivory and valuable woods have survived to our time practically intact, because secluded in inviolated secret tombs, they were protected from decay also by the dry environment of desert.Many buildings and parts of these (above all roofs) contained elements in wood (often of oak) forming structural supports and covering; means of transport such as boats, ships; and later (with the invention of the wheel) wagons and carriages, winches, flour mills powered by water, etc.

Dimensions and geography 
The main source of the lumber used in the world is forests, which can be classified as virgin, semivirgin and plantations. Much timber is removed for firewood by local populations in many countries, especially in the third world, but this amount can only be estimated, with wide margins of uncertainty.

Cut logs and branches destined to become elements for building construction accounted for approximately 55% of the world's industrial wood production. 25% became wood pulp (including wood powder and broccoli) mainly destined for the production of paper and paperboard, and approximately 20% became panels in plywood and valuable wood for furniture and objects of common use (FAO 1998). The World's largest producer and consumer of officially accounted wood are the United States, although the country that possesses the greatest area of forest in Russia.

In the 1970s, the countries with the largest forest area were: Soviet Union (approximately 8,800,000 km2), Brazil (5,150,000 km2), Canada (4,400,000 km2), United States (3,000,000 km2), Indonesia (1,200,000 km2) and Democratic Republic of Congo (1,000,000 km2). Other countries with important production and consumption of wood usually have a low density of population in relation to their territorial extension, here we can include countries as Argentina, Chile, Finland, Poland, Sweden, Ukraine.

By 2001 the rainforest areas of Brazil were reduced by a fifth (respect of 1970), to around 4,000,000 km2; the ground cleared was mainly destined for cattle pasture—Brazil is the world's largest exporter of beef with almost 200,000,000 head of cattle. The booming Brazilian ethanol economy based upon sugar cane cultivation, is likewise reducing forests area. Canadian forest was reduced by almost 30% to 3,101,340 km2 over the same period.

Importance in limiting climate change 

Regarding the problem of climate change, it is known that burning forests increase CO2 in the atmosphere, while intact virgin forest or plantations act as sinks for CO2, for these reasons wood economy fights greenhouse effect. The amount of CO2 absorbed depends on the type of trees, lands and the climate of the place where trees naturally grow or are planted. Moreover, by night plants do not photosynthesize, and produce CO2, eliminated the successive day. Paradoxically in summer oxygen created by photosynthesis in forests near to cities and urban parks, interacts with urban air pollution (from cars, etc.) and is transformed by solar beams in ozone (molecule of three oxygen atoms), that while in high atmosphere constitutes a filter against ultraviolet beams, in the low atmosphere is a pollutant, able to provoke respiratory disturbances.

In a low-carbon economy, forestry operations will be focused on low-impact practices and regrowth.  Forest managers will make sure that they do not disturb soil-based carbon reserves too much. Specialized tree farms will be the main source of material for many products.  Quick maturing tree varieties will be grown on short rotations to maximize output.

Production by country

In Australia 
 Eucalyptus: these are seven hundred tree species from Australia, that grow very fast in tropical, sub-tropical and semi-arid climates, and are very resistant to forest fires (with their tree cortex) and drought. Its essential oil is used in pharmacology, its wood for building, and the small branches as firewood and pulpwood.

In Brazil 
Brazil has a long tradition in the harvesting of several types of trees with specific uses. Since the 1960s, imported species of pine tree and eucalyptus have been grown mostly for the plywood and paper pulp industries. Currently high-level research is being conducted, to apply the enzymes of sugar cane fermentation to cellulose in wood, to obtain methanol, but the cost is much higher when compared with ethanol derived from corn costs.
 Brazilwood: has a dense, orange-red heartwood that takes a high red shine (brasa=ember), and it is the premier wood used for making bows for string instruments from the violin family. These trees soon became the biggest source of red dye, and they were such a large part of the economy and export of that country, that slowly it was known as Brazil.
 Hevea brasiliensis: is the biggest source of the best latex, that is used to manufacture many objects in rubber, as an example gloves, condoms, anti-allergic mattresses and tires (vulcanized rubber). Latex has the ability to adjust to the exact shape of the body part, an advantage over polyurethane or polyethylene gloves.

In Canada and the US 
There is a close relation in the forestry economy between these countries; they have many tree genera in common, and Canada is the main producer of wood and wooden items destined to the US, the biggest consumer of wood and its byproducts in the world. The water systems of the Great Lakes, Erie Canal, Hudson River and Saint Lawrence Seaway to the east coast and the Mississippi River to the central plains and Louisiana allows transportation of logs at very low costs. On the west coast, the basin of the Columbia River has plenty of forests with excellent timber.

Canada 
The agency Canada Wood Council calculates that in the year 2005 in Canada, the forest sector employed 930,000 workers (1 job in every 17), making around $108 billion of value in goods and services. For many years products derived from trees in Canadian forests had been the most important export items of the country. In 2011, exports around the world totaled some $64.3 billion – the single largest contributor to Canadian trade balance.

Canada is the world leader in sustainable forest management practices. Only  (28% of Canadian forests) are currently managed for timber production while an estimated  are protected from harvesting by the current legislation.

The Canadian timber industry has led to environmental conflict with Indigenous people protecting their land from logging. For example, the Asubpeeschoseewagong First Nation set up the Grassy Narrows road blockade for twenty years beginning in 2002 to prevent clearcutting of their land.

United States 

 Cherry: a hardwood prized for its high quality in grain, width, color, and rich warm glow. The first trees were carried to the lands surrounding Rome (Latium) from Armenia. In the United States, most cherry trees are grown in Washington, Pennsylvania, West Virginia, California and Oregon.
 Cedar: this genus is a group of conifers of the family Pinaceae, originating from high mountain areas from the Carpathians, Lebanon and Turkey to the Himalayas. Their scented wood make them suitable for chests and closet lining. Cedar oil and wood is known to be a natural repellent to moths. Actually are planted in western and southern US, mostly for ornamental purposes, but also for the production of pencils (specially incense-cedar).
 Douglas fir: a native tree of the United States west coast and Mountain States, with records in fast growth and high statures in brief time. The coast Douglas fir grows in coastal regions up to altitudes of about 1,800 meters; the Rocky Mountain Douglas fir grows farther inland, at altitudes ranging from 800 m to 3,000 m or higher. The wood is used for construction, for homebuilt aircraft, for paper pulp, and also as firewood.
 Hybrid poplar is being investigated by Oak Ridge National Laboratory in Tennessee for genetic engineering to obtain a tree with a higher content of cellulose and a lower content in lignin, in such a way that the extraction of bioethanol (useful as a fuel) could be easier and less expensive.
 Walnut: a prized furniture and carving hardwood because of its colour, hardness, grain and durability. Walnut wood has been the timber of choice for gun makers for centuries. It remains one of the most popular choices for rifle and shotgun stocks.

In the Caribbean and Central America 
 Mahogany: has a straight grain, usually free of voids and pockets. The most prized species come from Cuba and Honduras. It has a reddish-brown color, which darkens over time, and displays a beautiful reddish sheen when polished. It has excellent workability, is available in big boards, and is very durable. Mahogany is used in the making of many musical instruments, as drums, acoustic and electric guitars' back and side, and luxury headphones.

In Europe

Italy 

The species that are ideal for the many uses in this type of economy are those employed by arboriculture, that are very well known for their features and the need for certain types of ground and climates.
 Fraxinus: being a lightweight wood is easy to transport, as firewood burns easily, grows in damp environments like those present in river flooding areas, stands pollution of water and air.
 Larix: in Italy it grows at high altitudes around mountain tops, its timber stand sudden climatic change, from icy winds to high temperatures in sunny afternoon summers, it is excellent for use in the building of exposed structures as bridges, roofs, etc.
 Stone pine: "Mediterranean pine" could be the noble emblem of many coastal areas in Italy, originally giant forests of pines extended from the mouth of the Tiber river until Liguria and Provence in France, over soils with high salinity, not very apt for agriculture. Its trees produce a vast amount of dry branches that can be burnt, cones (used for Christmas decoration) and needle-like foliage that can be burnt, or used as mulch. Oils and resins can be used in scents and ointments. The pinoli are useful elements in Italian cooking (along with basil are tritured to make pesto sauce). Currently, "progress" has brought to a severe reduction of this magnificent tree extensions, and in many places cheap beach buildings, car-parking and semi-abandoned areas have taken their place.
 Poplar: in Italy is the most important species for tree plantations, is used for several purposes as plywood manufacture, packing boxes, paper, matches, etc. It needs good quality grounds with good drainage, but can be used to protect the cultivations if disposed in windbreak lines. More than 70% of Italian poplar cultivations are located in the pianura Padana. Constantly the extension of the cultivation is being reduced, from 650 km2 in the 1980s to current 350 km2. The yield of poplars is about 1,500 t/km2 of wood every year. The production from poplars is around 45–50% of the total Italian wood production.
 In the history of art poplar was the wood of choice for painting surfaces as panels, as in Renaissance (The Mona Lisa by Leonardo da Vinci). Because of this reason, many of the products with the highest added value, extremely expensive, are made with wood from the humble but durable poplar.
 Because of the presence of tannic acid, poplar cortex was often used in Europe for the tanning of leather.

Portugal 
 Oak for cork: are trees with a slow growth, but long life, are cultivated in warm hill areas (min. temp. > −5°Celsius) in all the west area of Mediterranean shores. Cork is popular as a material for bulletin boards. Even if the production as stoppers for wine bottles is diminishing in favor of nylon stoppers, in the sake of energy saving granules of cork can be mixed into concrete. These composites have low thermal conductivity, low density and good energy absorption (earthquake resistant). Some of the property ranges of the composites are density (400–1500 kg/m3), compressive strength (1–26 MPa) and flexural strength (0.5–4.0 MPa). Because of this cork can be used as thermal isolation in buildings (as well in its natural form and as a mixture), useful also as sound insulation. In the shoe industry cork is used for soles and insoles. In the world there are 20,000 km2 of cork oak plantations, and every year are extracted around 300,000 tons of cork, 50% in Portugal, 15,000 in Italy (12,000 in the island of Sardinia). The advantage of this natural industry is that the extraction of cork from layers outer to the cortex does not kill the tree.

In Fennoscandia and Russia 

In Sweden, Finland and to an extent Norway, much of the land area is forested, and the pulp and paper industry is one of the most significant industrial sectors. Chemical pulping produces an excess of energy, since the organic matter in black liquor, mostly lignin and hemicellulose breakdown products, is burned in the recovery boiler. Thus, these countries have high proportions of renewable energy use (25% in Finland, for instance). Considerable effort is directed towards increasing the value and usage of forest products by companies and by government projects.

 Scots pine and Norway spruce: These species comprise most of the boreal forest, and together as a softwood mixture they are converted into chemical pulp for paper.
 Birch is a genus with many species of trees in Scandinavia and Russia, excellent for acid soils. These act as pioneer species in the frozen border between taiga and tundra, and are very resistant to periods of drought and icy conditions. The species Betula nana has been identified as the ideal tree for the acid, nutrient-poor soils of mountain slopes, where these trees can be used to restrain landslides, including in southern Europe. Dissolving pulp is produced from birch. Xylitol can be produced by the hydrogenation of xylose, which is a byproduct of chemical birch pulping.

Outputs

Combustion

The burning of wood is currently the largest use of energy derived from a solid fuel biomass. Wood fuel may be available as firewood (e.g. logs, bolts, blocks), charcoal, chips, sheets, pellets and sawdust. Wood fuel can be used for cooking and heating through stoves and fireplaces, and occasionally for fueling steam engines and steam turbines that generate electricity. For many centuries many types of traditional ovens were used to benefit from the heat generated by wood combustion. Now, more efficient and clean solutions have been developed: advanced fireplaces (with heat exchangers), wood-fired ovens, wood-burning stoves and pellet stoves, that are able to filter and separate pollutants (centrifuging ashes with rotative filters), thus eliminating many emissions, also allowing to recover a higher quantity of heat that escaped with the chimney fumes.

Mean energy density of wood, was calculated at around 6–17 Megajoule/Kilogram, depending on species and moisture content.

Combustion of wood is, however, linked to the production of micro-environmental pollutants, as carbon dioxide (CO2), carbon monoxide (CO) (an invisible gas able to provoke irreversible saturation of blood's hemoglobine), as well as nanoparticles.

In Italy poplar has been proposed as a tree cultivated to be transformed into biofuels, because of the excellent ratio of energy extracted from its wood because of poplar's fast growing and capture of atmospheric carbon dioxide to the small amount of energy needed to cultivate, cut and transport the trees.

Charcoal

Charcoal is the dark grey residue consisting of impure carbon obtained by removing water and other volatile constituents from animal and vegetation substances.  Charcoal is usually produced by slow pyrolysis, the heating of wood or other substances in the absence of oxygen. Charcoal can then be used as a fuel with a higher combustion temperature.

Wood gasogen
Wood gas generator (gasogen): is a bulky and heavy device (but technically simple) that transforms burning wood in a mix of molecular hydrogen (H2), carbon monoxide (CO), carbon dioxide (CO2), molecular nitrogen (N2) and water vapor (H2O). This gas mixture, known as "wood gas", "poor gas" or "syngas" is obtained after the combustion of dry wood in a reductive environment (low in oxygen) with a limited amount of atmospheric air, at temperatures of 900° Celsius, and can fuel an internal combustion engine.

In the time between World War I and World War II included, because of the lack of oil, in many countries, like Italy, France, Great Britain and Sweden, several gasoline-powered cars were modified, with the addition of a wood gas generator (a "gasogen"), a device powered by wood, coal, or burnable waste, able to produce (and purify) gas that immediately, in the same vehicle, could power a slightly modified ICE engine of a standard car (low-compression engine). Carburetor had to be changed with an air-gas mixer). There were several setbacks, as the great reduction of maximum speed and the need to drive using low gears and wisely dosing the amount of air. In modern cars, modified with a wood gas generator, gas emissions (CO, CO2 and NOx) are lower to those of the same vehicle running with gasoline (keeping the same catalytic converter).

Methanol

Methanol (the simplest alcohol) behaves as a liquid at 25 °C, is toxic and corrosive, and in organic chemistry basic books is often called "the spirit of wood", since it can be obtained from wood fermentation. Rarely, when unwise wine-makers mix small chunks of wood and leaves with grapes, methanol can be found as a pollutant of the blend of water, ethanol and other substances derived from grape's fermentation.

The best way to obtain methanol from wood is through syngas (CO, CO2, H2) produced by the anhydrous pyrolysis of wood, a method discovered by ancient Egyptians.

Methanol can be used as an oxygen-rich additive for gasoline. However, it is usually much cheaper to produce methanol from methane or from syngas.  Methanol is the most important base material for industrial chemistry, where it is often used to make more complex molecules through reactions of halogenation and chemical addition reaction.

Gas turbine

Tanks
Its advantages over turbo-diesel engine, are the small size and light weight, the lack of a radiator (which gives an advantage against the effect of gun and cannon shots and missile strikes suffered in battle). A setback is the high fuel consumption, since the turbine engine has not the ability to work at a low revolutions per minute rate, much lower than ideal, and during the march this engine consumes twice as much fuel as a modern turbo-diesel engine with intercooler and direct injection.

Construction

Wood is relatively light in weight, because its specific weight is less than 500 kg/m3, this is an advantage, when compared against 2,000–2,500 kg/m3 for reinforced concrete or 7,800 kg/m3 for steel.

Wood is strong, because the efficiency of wood for structural purposes has qualities that are similar to steel.

Bridges, levees, microhydro, piers
Wood is used to build bridges (as the Magere bridge in Amsterdam), as well as water and air mills, and microhydro generators for electricity.

Housing
Hardwood is used as a material in wooden houses, and other structures with a broad range of dimensions. In traditional homes wood is preferred for ceilings, doors, floorings and windows. Wooden frames were traditionally used for home ceilings, but they risk collapse during fires.

The development of energy efficient houses including the "passive house" has revamped the importance of wood in construction, because wood provides acoustic and thermal insulation, with much better results than concrete.

Earthquake resistant buildings
In Japan, ancient buildings, of relatively high elevation, like pagodas, historically had shown to be able to resist earthquakes of high intensity, thanks to the traditional building techniques, employing elastic joints, and to the excellent ability of wooden frames to elastically deform and absorb severe accelerations and compressive shocks.

In 2006, Italian scientists from CNR patented a building system that they called "SOFIE", a seven-storey wooden building, 24 meters high, built by the "Istituto per la valorizzazione del legno e delle specie arboree" (Ivalsa) of San Michele all'Adige. In 2007 it was tested with the hardest Japanese antiseismic test for civil structures: the simulation of Kobe's earthquake (7.2 Richter scale), with the building placed over an enormous oscillating platform belonging to the NIED-Institute, located in Tsukuba science park, near the city of Miki in Japan. This Italian project, employed very thin and flexible panels in glued laminated timber, and according to CNR researchers could lead to the construction of much more safe houses in seismic areas.

Shipbuilding
One of the most enduring materials is the lumber from virginian southern live oak and white oak, specially live oak is 60% stronger than white oak and more resistant to moisture. As an example, the main component in the structure of battle ship , the world's oldest commissioned naval vessel afloat (launched in 1797) is white oak.

Woodworking

Woodworking is the activity or skill of making items from wood, and includes cabinet making (cabinetry and furniture), wood carving, joinery, carpentry, and woodturning. Millions of people make a livelihood on woodworking projects.

See also
 Autarchy
 Canada–United States softwood lumber dispute
 Forest Stewardship Council
 Low-carbon economy

Notes and references

Bibliography 

 Diamond, Jared. 2005. Collapse. How Societies Choose to Fail or Succeed. New York: Viking. .
 "Construction of a Simplified Wood Gas Generator for Fueling Internal Combustion Engines in a Petroleum Emergency"

External links 

 Fast Growing Trees
 Forestry Encyclopedia – Forests and Forestry in the Americas
 Canadian Forests – Quick Facts
 Canadian Forests – Information Reseources
 UNECE – FAO – Timber Committee – European Forestry Commission
 WOODGAS: Biomass Energy Foundation (BEF) website
 Oldest Wood house at Czech Republic
http://www.globalwood.org/

See also

Deforestation
Forest Products Association of Canada
Forest Stewardship Council
Hardwood/softwood
Illegal logging
Lumber industry on the Ottawa River
National Hardwood Lumber Association
Pulp and paper industry in the United States

 
Forestry
Industries (economics)
Agricultural economics
Alternative energy economy
Low-carbon economy
Sustainable technologies
Resource economics